Ahmed Easa (born 7 October 1985) is a Maldivian film actor.

Career
In his childhood, Ahmed Easa watched Bollywood films and imitated the acting of Sunil Shetty in stage performances. While watching his movies, Easa grew a fondness towards cinema and decided to pursue a career in acting "if granted with a chance worth holding for". He was first offered a role in Amjad Ibrahim's romantic horror film Udhabaani (2009) but he rejected it since he was "too shy to be in front of the camera with his current physique". However, he made his film debut two years later with Hamid Ali's Laelaa (2011) co-starring Yoosuf Shafeeu, Amira Ismail and Ali. The film revolves around two daughters who are forced into an arranged marriages by their parents. The film and his performance received a negative response from critics; "The newcomer is strictly average in his performance but he needs to be more confident in his moves and work on the dialogue delivery if needs to survive in the industry". The film was declared a flop at box office.

After shooting a video single with Yoosuf Shafeeu, Easa was asked to feature in his thirtieth direction Dhevansoora (2018), a suspense thriller film featuring an ensemble cast including Shafeeu, Mariyam Shifa, Ali Azim and Fathimath Azifa in pivotal roles. He initially shot for the role of a policeman, portrayed by Mohamed Faisal in the film, before Shafeeu suggested he switch to a "more complex" role since he was unable to find anyone "who fits the bill" for that role. Revolving around a murder investigating, Easa played a delivery boy who has been accused to be involved in the murder crime. The film received positive reviews from critics and was considered a "norm-breaker" for the Maldivian cinema. Ahmed Hameed Adam reviewing from VNews applauded Easa's performance while playing the "strong-headed man and the vulnerable attacker". He then starred in the first Maldivian web-series, a romantic drama by Fathimath Nahula, Huvaa. The series consisting of sixty episodes and streamed through the digital platform Baiskoafu, centers around a happy and radiant family which breaks into despairing pieces after a tragic incident that led to an unaccountable loss. The series and his performance as an irresponsible and lazy husband and a drug addict were positively received.

2019 was a successful year for Ease where he had multiple film releases. He first starred in Yoosuf Shafeeu's horror comedy film 40+ (2019), a sequel to 2017 released comedy film Naughty 40, which was well received both critically and commercially. Their next collaboration, Nafrathuvumun (2019) played alongside Shafeeu, Mariyam Azza and Ali Azim revolves around a guesthouse, the only source of income for a woman who is convinced by several men to sell the property. This was followed by another direction from Shafeeu, the romantic horror film Dhauvath (2019), which follows a happily married couple who goes on a honeymoon trip and the paranormal activities they experience due to black-magic. Mariyam Waheedha from Miadhu considers his portrayal of the character Saajid to be "surprisingly good".

Filmography

Feature film

Television

References

External links
 

Living people
People from Malé
21st-century Maldivian male actors
Maldivian male film actors
1985 births